Garretson Warner Gibson (20 May 1832 – 26 April 1910) was the 14th president of Liberia from 1900 to 1904. Born in Baltimore, Maryland, United States, his family emigrated to Liberia in 1845. After receiving an education in mission schools, he returned to Maryland to study theology. Ordained a priest, he served as rector of the Episcopalian Trinity Church in Monrovia. He also served as Chaplain of the Liberian Senate. Later, he served as President of the Trustee Board of Liberia College and at one time President of the college.

Gibson began his political life as a justice of the peace. With the election of William D. Coleman as president in 1896, Gibson was appointed secretary of the interior. He was secretary of state when Coleman resigned in 1900, and because there was no vice-president, Gibson was chosen to succeed him. He won his own term later that year and served until 1904.

Gibson died in Monrovia on 26 April 1910. He was the last Liberian president to have been born in the United States.

Presidency (1900–1904)

Prior to attaining the presidency, Gibson had had a long career in government including serving as Secretary of the Interior and Secretary of State.

In 1903, the British forced a concession of Liberian territory to Sierra Leone, but tension along that border remained high.

Whenever the British and French seemed intent on enlarging at Liberia's expense the neighboring territories they already controlled, periodic appearances by U.S. warships helped discourage encroachment, even though successive American administrations rejected appeals from Monrovia for more forceful support.

See also
History of Liberia

References

Sources
Nathaniel R. Richardson, Liberia's Past and Present. London: The Diplomatic Press and Publishing Company, 1959.

Further reading
See History of Liberia, further reading

External links
See History of Liberia, external links

Americo-Liberian people
1832 births
1910 deaths
Presidents of Liberia
Liberian educators
Presidents of the University of Liberia
True Whig Party politicians
Politicians from Baltimore
Secretaries of the Interior (Liberia)
Liberian Episcopalians
Foreign Ministers of Liberia
American emigrants to Liberia
African-American Episcopalians
19th-century American Episcopalians
American Episcopal priests
19th-century African-American people

19th-century Liberian politicians
20th-century Liberian politicians